Timia rugifrons is a species of ulidiid or picture-winged fly in the genus Timia of the family Tephritidae.

References

Timia (fly)